Frank Williams (December 14, 1936 – February 25, 2010) was an American architect who worked as a lead architect on nearly 20 buildings in Manhattan, including Trump Palace Condominiums, 515 Park Avenue, and the W Hotels  in Times Square. Williams graduated from UC Berkeley in 1961, and received a master's degree from Harvard in 1965. He moved to New York City and taught at Columbia University for the next few years.

He co-authored Urban Design Manhattan, an influential book advocating distinctive skyscrapers and design in Manhattan. He is also the subject of The Architecture of Frank Williams (Architecture Today), published in 1997.

Projects 
Frank Williams has designed a number of notable buildings in New York:

515 Park Avenue, New York, NY, USA
The London Hotel, New York, NY, USA
W Times Square Hotel, New York, NY, USA
Trump Palace, New York, NY, USA
Four Seasons Hotel, New York, NY, USA (with I.M. Pei & Partners)
World Wide Plaza Residential Complex, New York, NY, USA
The Park Belvedere, New York, NY, USA
The Belaire, New York, NY, USA
The Vanderbilt, New York, NY, USA

And across the world:

Mercury City Tower, Moscow, Russia
Burj Residential Tower, Dubai, U.A.E
Samsung Residential Tower, Seoul, South Korea
Taipei Tower F4, Taipei, Taiwan
Lang Suan Ville, Bangkok, Thailand

Gallery

References

External links
 Frank Williams & Partners Architects LLP
 An American Architect in Moscow: Frank Williams, Passport Moscow 

1936 births
2010 deaths
Harvard Graduate School of Design alumni
UC Berkeley College of Environmental Design alumni
Architects from New York City